A constant-function market maker (CFMM) is a market maker with the property that the amount of any asset held in its inventory is completely described by a well-defined function of the amounts of the other assets in its inventory. As a result, both wealth and liquidity are known and fixed given relative prices. This has made these rules popular in prediction markets (fixed cost of information) and decentralized finance (known price exposure).

History 
An early description of a CFMM was published by economist Robin Hanson in "Logarithmic Market Scoring Rules for Modular Combinatorial Information Aggregation" (2002). Early literature referred to the broader class of "automated market makers", including that of the Hollywood Stock Exchange founded in 1999; the term "constant-function market maker" was introduced in "Improved Price Oracles: Constant Function Market Makers" (Angeris & Chitra 2020). First be seen in production on a Minecraft server in 2012, CFMMs are a popular DEX architecture.

Definition

Trading function 
A CFMM is described by a continuous trading function (also known as the invariant, AMM invariant, or CFMM invariant)

over the inventory amounts (commonly referred to as reserves), such that the market maker only accepts trades which leave  unchanged. In order for the market maker to not give away assets for free,  must be monotone (intermediate value theorem), and it can be assumed WLOG that  is increasing.

Portfolio Value 
The portfolio value

of a CFMM as a function of the market prices of the assets in its inventory, is the worst-case market value of its inventory, which under assumptions of perfect competition is equal to the infimum of the dot product of inventory amounts with prices, over all inventory amounts such that the CFMM quotes at market price.

If  is a "consistent payoff function", that is, a payoff function which is concave, nonnegative, nondecreasing, and 1-homogenous, it is possible to construct a trading function which achieves . It has been noted that this includes the intrinsic value of any negative-gamma derivative contract. Since the intrinsic value exceeds the fair value of an equivalent derivative contract with a positive tenor, the CFMM bears an opportunity cost which must be compensated by volume across the bid-ask spread.

Crowdfunded CFMMs 
A crowdfunded CFMM is a CFMM which makes markets using assets deposited by many different users. Users may contribute their assets to the CFMM's inventory, and receive in exchange a pro rata share of the inventory, claimable at any point for the assets in the inventory at that time the claim is made.

Fees 
Adding a bid-ask spread on top of a CFMM breaks the constant-function invariant. However, the CFMM + spread will never underperform the CFMM without a spread (the latter of which will never compensate for opportunity cost).

Examples 
 Uniswap 
 RMM-01 
 PMMP 
 StableSwap

References 

Financial markets